Nighthawks Orchestra is a New York-based musical group, led by music historian Vince Giordano, that concentrates on recreations of the hot jazz and dance music styles of the period between 1919 and the mid-1930s.

Recordings by the Nighthawks Orchestra have been featured in many television shows, radio broadcasts, and movies. Film scores that include the Nighthawks include The Aviator (2004) as well as pictures directed by Woody Allen.

References

External links
Webster Records 
Review in Show Business Weekly 
Resource Entertainment Group 

American jazz ensembles from New York City
Big bands